Duruelo de la Sierra is a municipality of Spain, in the province of Soria, Autonomous Community of Castile and León (Spanish Comunidad Autónoma de Castilla y León).

Population 
Duruelo de la Sierra has an area of 44.55 km², with a population of 1,473 inhabitants and a density of 31.56/km².

Geography 
 Altitude: 1205 metres
 Distance to Soria: 55 kilometres

Monuments and Statues 
 Santa Marina Hermitage.
 San Miguel Arcángel Church (12th Century), extended 16th Century.
 Medieval Graveyard, behind San Miguel's Church. Much touristic interest, dating from the 9th to the 10th Century. (Spanish Necròpolis Medieval)

Flora and fauna 
The flora of this particular region is emphasized by Scots Pine (Spanish: pino albar), accompanied by Erica vagans (Spanish: brezo), and Oak Tree (Spanish: roble).

The fauna for this particular region is emphasized by Red Deer (Spanish: ciervo), European Roe Deer (Spanish: corzo), Wild Boar (Spanish: jabalí) and Eagle (Spanish: águila).

Economy 

 Forest advantages, distribution between neighbours results in a gain of sales of the pines.
 Furniture and Wood Industry, the great industrial estate is currently expanding.
 There exists several sawmills where the pines become planks, and are sold to Spain and other countries.

Locations 
 Pico de Urbión (lit. Tip of Urbión): observed from the valley, much touristic interest.
 Castroviejo: location contains unusual rock formations.
 Cueva Serena (lit. Calm Cave)
 La Chorla
 Ambas Cuerdas (lit. Both Cords)
 Fuente del berro (lit. Source of the Watercress)
 Peñas blancas (lit. White Rocks)
 Laguna de Urbión (lit. Lagoon of Urbión)
 Nacimiento del Duero (lit. Birth of Duero)

 International relations 

 Twin towns — Sister cities 

Duruelo de la Sierra is twinned with:

  Porto, Portugal, since 1989

 Festivals and traditions 
 Festivals 
 Martes de Carnaval: A Tuesday of February or March.
 Santa Marina: 17 and 18 of July.
 El Cristo: 13 to 17 of September.

 Traditions 
 La Ronda: the celebration of Martes de Carnaval and Santa Marina.
 Vaca Flaca: the celebration of Martes de Carnaval.
 La Rueda (lit. The Wheel)
 Colgar al Judas (lit. Hanging of Judas'')

See also
Picos de Urbión

References

External links 
  Official Website 

Towns in Spain
Municipalities in the Province of Soria